Couple of Days is a 2016 Nigerian Romantic comedy film directed by Tolu Lordtanner and produced by Ayo Orunmuyi broke box office record when released as the highest ticket sales in one day for any Nollywood movie in Cinema in February.  The film stars Lilian Esoro, Adesua Etomi Wellington, Eyinna Nwigwe, Ademola Adedoyin, Kiki Omeili, Olayode Juliana, Falz. It was released on 5 February 2016 and premiered on Netflix in 2019.

Plot  
The film tells the story of three different couples who went on a romantic getaway and how they handle the realities of marriage and its consequences.

Cast 

 Adesua Etomi-Wellington as Nina
 Enyinna Nwigwe as Jude
 Kiki Omeili as Joke
 Okey Uzoeshi as Dan
 Lilian Esoro
 Ademola Adedoyin
 Falz

References

External links 
 
 

2017 films
2017 romantic comedy films
Nigerian romantic comedy films
English-language Nigerian films